Ctenotus storri, also known commonly as the buff-striped ctenotus or Storr's ctenotus,  is a species of lizard in the family Scincidae. The species is endemic to Australia.

Etymology
The specific name, storri, is in honour of Australian herpetologist Glen Milton Storr.

Geographic range
C. storri is found in the Northern Territory in Australia.

Habitat
The preferred natural habitats of C. storri are grassland and savanna.

Reproduction
C. storri is oviparous.

References

Further reading
Cogger HG (2014). Reptiles and Amphibians of Australia, Seventh Edition. Clayton, Victoria, Australia: CSIRO Publishing. xxx + 1,033 pp. 
Rankin, Peter R. (1978). "A new species of lizard (Lacertilia: Scincidae) from the Northern Territory, closely allied to Ctenotus decaneurus Storr ". Records of the Australian Museum 31 (10): 395–409. (Ctenotus storri, new species).
Wilson, Steve; Swan, Gerry (2013). A Complete Guide to Reptiles of Australia, Fourth Edition. Sydney: New Holland Publishers. 522 pp. .

storri
Reptiles described in 1978
Taxa named by Peter R. Rankin